HMAS Armidale (ACPB 83), named for the city of Armidale, New South Wales, is the lead ship of the Armidale class of patrol boats serving in the Royal Australian Navy (RAN).

Design and construction

The semi-displacement vee hull is fabricated from aluminium alloy, and each vessel is built to a combination of Det Norske Veritas standards for high-speed light craft and RAN requirements.

The main armament of the Armidale class is a Rafael Typhoon stabilised  gun mount fitted with an M242 Bushmaster autocannon. Two  machine guns are also carried. Boarding operations are performed by two , waterjet propelled rigid-hulled inflatable boats (RHIBs). Each RHIB is stored in a dedicated cradle and davit, and is capable of operating independently from the patrol boat as it carries its own communications, navigation, and safety equipment.Heron & Powell, in Australian Maritime Issues 2006, p. 131

Each patrol boat has a standard ship's company of 21 personnel, with a maximum of 29. The Armidale class have returned to a permanently assigned ship's company; previously they were assigned to divisions at a ratio of two vessels to three companies, which rotated through the vessels and allow platforms to spend more time at sea.Kerr, Patrol boats shake down fuel faults A 20-berth auxiliary accommodation compartment was included in the design for the transportation of soldiers, illegal fishermen, or unauthorised arrivals; in the latter two cases, the compartment could be secured from the outside. However, a malfunction in the sewerage treatment facilities aboard  in August 2006 pumped hydrogen sulfide and carbon monoxide into the compartment, non-fatally poisoning four sailors working inside, after which use of the compartment for accommodation was banned across the class.Armidale was constructed by Austal in Henderson, Western Australia. She was commissioned into the RAN at HMAS Coonawarra in Darwin on 24 June 2005.

Operational historyArmidale is based in Darwin, and performs border protection and fisheries protection patrols. After protests began in Solomon Islands in late 2021, the Australian Federal government deployed Armidale in addition to a team of Australian Army and Australian Federal Police officers to assist the Royal Solomon Islands Police Force to quell the unrest.

Citations

References
Books

 The chapter is available separately as Semaphore'', Issue 4, 2006 in PDF and HTML formats.

Journal and news articles

External links
Royal Australian Navy webpage for HMAS Armidale

Armidale-class patrol boats
Ships built by Austal
Naval ships of Australia
2005 ships